The Aero Engineers Australia (AEA) Maverick is a single-seat sportsplane of conventional configuration.  Constructed largely of composite materials, it is powered by a 75 kW (100 hp) Continental O-200A engine and is capable of manoeuvres with loads of up to +6 or −3 g.

The sole example of the aircraft was registered as VH-JOX and resides in New South Wales, Australia. This aircraft first flew in December 1987.

Specifications (AEA Maverick)

References

External links
The Maverick on AEA's website

Maverick
1980s Australian sport aircraft
Light-sport aircraft
Aircraft first flown in 1987